The Flanders Sports Arena is a multi-purpose indoor arena in Ghent, Belgium. Opened in 2000, the Flanders Sports Arena can hold up to 5,000 people in sporting events.

It was realized through a public-private partnership between the Flemish Government, Bloso, the provincial Government of East Flanders, Flanders Expo and the city council of Ghent. The venue is managed by agency Sport Vlaanderen Ghent.

Facilities
The hall has 3,539 seats which, if required, can be expanded to more than 5,000 seats. This accommodation has a fixed athletics track with 6 lanes of 200 meters. The central area has an area of 2150 m² that can be increased to 3000 m². It is used for other athletic disciplines such as 60-meter sprint, high jump, long jump, hop jump, pole vault and shot put. In the winter the emphasis is mainly on athletics. In addition, this accommodation is also suitable for the organization of other (top) sporting events and competitions.

Events
Since it was opened in 2000, the arena has hosted the annual Indoor Flanders meeting, an indoor track and field competition. It hosted the 2001 World Artistic Gymnastics Championships and the 2000 European Athletics Indoor Championships.

See also
 List of indoor arenas in Belgium

References

External links
Official Site

Indoor arenas in Belgium
Sports venues in East Flanders
Sport in Ghent
Buildings and structures in Ghent
Sports venues completed in 2000
Indoor track and field venues
Tourist attractions in Ghent